Berylliosis, or chronic beryllium disease (CBD), is a chronic allergic-type lung response and chronic lung disease caused by exposure to beryllium and its compounds, a form of beryllium poisoning. It is distinct from acute beryllium poisoning, which became rare following occupational exposure limits established around 1950. Berylliosis is an occupational lung disease.

While there is no cure, symptoms can be treated.

Signs and symptoms
With single or prolonged exposure by inhalation the lungs may become sensitized to beryllium. Berylliosis has a slow onset and progression. Some people who are sensitized to beryllium may not have symptoms. Continued exposure causes the development of small inflammatory nodules, called granulomas. Of note, the authors of a 2006 study suggested that beryllium inhalation was not the only form of exposure and perhaps skin exposure was also a cause, as they found that a reduction in beryllium inhalation did not result in a reduction in CBD or beryllium sensitization.

Granulomas are seen in other chronic diseases, such as tuberculosis and sarcoidosis, and it can occasionally be hard to distinguish berylliosis from these disorders. However, granulomas of CBD will typically be non-caseating, i.e. not characterized by necrosis and therefore not exhibiting a cheese-like appearance grossly.

Ultimately, this process leads to restrictive lung disease (a decrease in diffusion capacity).

The earliest symptoms are typically cough and shortness of breath. Other symptoms include chest pain, joint aches, weight loss, and fever.

Rarely, one can get granulomas in other organs including the liver.

The onset of symptoms can range from weeks up to tens of years from the initial exposure. In some individuals, a single exposure to beryllium can cause berylliosis.

Pathogenesis 
In susceptible persons, beryllium exposure can lead to a cell-mediated immune response. The T-cells become sensitized to beryllium. Each subsequent exposure leads to an immune response involving CD4+ helper T-lymphocytes and macrophages accumulating in the lungs. As this response continues macrophages, CD+4 T-lymphocytes and plasma cells aggregate together to form the noncaseating granulomas. When beryllium is phagocytized by macrophages, the beryllium triggers macrophage apoptosis, thereby reducing beryllium clearance from the lungs and eventually resulting in secondary necrosis and lysis. Eventually, the outcome is fibrosis of the lung.

Several studies have shown that there is a genetic component to beryllium sensitivity. Specifically, those beryllium exposed workers with a mutation at the HLA-DPB1 Glu69 position have increased prevalence of beryllium sensitization and CBD.  The HLA-DPB1 gene is important for MHC class II molecule function on antigen presenting cells.

According to the International Agency for Research on Cancer (IARC), beryllium and beryllium compounds are Category 1 carcinogens; they are carcinogenic to both animals and humans.

Diagnosis
The differential diagnosis for berylliosis includes:
 Sarcoidosis
 Granulomatous lung diseases
 Tuberculosis
 Fungal infections (e.g., histoplasmosis)
 Granulomatosis with polyangiitis
 Idiopathic pulmonary fibrosis
 Hypersensitivity pneumonitis
 Asthma
Of these possibilities, berylliosis presents most similarly to sarcoidosis. Some studies suggest that up to 6% of all cases of sarcoidosis are actually berylliosis.

Definitive diagnosis of berylliosis is based on history of beryllium exposures, documented beryllium sensitivity and granulomatous inflammation on lung biopsy. Given the invasive nature of a lung biopsy, diagnosis can also be based on clinical history consistent with berylliosis, abnormal chest x-ray or CT scan findings, and abnormalities in pulmonary function tests.

Establishing beryllium sensitivity is the first step in diagnosis. The beryllium lymphocyte proliferation test (BeLPT) is the standard way of determining sensitivity to beryllium. The test is performed by acquiring either peripheral blood or fluid from a bronchial alveolar lavage, and lymphocytes are cultured with beryllium sulfate. Cells are then counted and those with elevated number of cells are considered abnormal. Those exposed persons with two abnormal BeLPT tested with peripheral blood, or one abnormal and one borderline result, are considered beryllium sensitized. Also, those with one abnormal BeLPT tested with fluid from a bronchial alveolar lavage are considered sensitized.

Chest radiography findings of berylliosis are non-specific. Early in the disease radiography findings are usually normal. In later stages interstitial fibrosis,  pleural irregularities, hilar lymphadenopathy and ground-glass opacities have been reported. Findings on CT are also not specific to berylliosis. Findings that are common in CT scans of people with berylliosis include parenchymal nodules in early stages. One study found that ground-glass opacities were more commonly seen on CT scan in berylliosis than in sarcoidosis. In later stages hilar lymphadenopathy, interstitial pulmonary fibrosis and pleural thickening.

Classification
Berylliosis is an occupational disease. Relevant occupations are those where beryllium is mined, processed or converted into metal alloys, or where machining of metals containing beryllium and recycling of scrap alloys occurs. It is associated with aerospace manufacturing, microwave semiconductor electronics, beryllium mining or manufacturing of fluorescent light bulbs (which once contained beryllium compounds in their internal phosphor coating). Beryllia was used in lamp manufacture because of ceramic's obvious virtues for insulation and heat resistance, and also because beryllia could be made transparent. Certain welding anodes along with other electrical contacts and even non-sparking tools are made of beryllium copper alloy and the subsequent machining of such materials would cause the disease as well.

Prevention
Compliance with the current U.S. Occupational Safety and Health Administration (OSHA) permissible exposure limit for beryllium of  has been determined to be inadequate to protect workers from developing beryllium sensitization and CBD. This TLV is 40 times lower than the current OSHA permissible exposure limit, reflecting the ACGIH analysis of best available peer-reviewed research data concerning how little airborne beryllium is required to cause sensitization and CBD.

Because it can be difficult to control industrial exposures to beryllium, it is advisable to use any methods possible to reduce airborne and surface contamination by beryllium, to minimize the use of beryllium and beryllium-containing alloys whenever possible, and to educate people about the potential hazards if they are likely to encounter beryllium dust or fumes. It is important to damp wipe metallographic preparation equipment to prevent accumulation of dry particles. Sectioning, grinding, and polishing must be performed under sufficiently vented hoods equipped with special filters.

On 29 January 2009, the Los Alamos National Laboratory announced it was notifying nearly 2,000 current and former employees and visitors that they may have been exposed to beryllium in the lab and may be at risk of disease. Concern over possible exposure to the material was first raised in November 2008, when a box containing beryllium was received at the laboratory's short-term storage facility.

Treatment 
There is no cure for berylliosis; the goals of treatment are to reduce symptoms and slow the progression of disease.

Although the evidence that stopping exposure to beryllium decreases progression of the disease is limited, it is still considered to be an accepted approach to treatment in any stage of disease.

People with early stages of disease, without lung function abnormalities or clinical symptoms, are periodically monitored with physical exams, pulmonary function testing and radiography.

Once clinical symptoms or significant abnormalities in pulmonary function testing appear, treatments include oxygen and oral corticosteroids and whatever supportive therapy is required.

Outcomes
Overall mortality rates are 5–38%.

Epidemiology 
The number of workers in the United States exposed to beryllium vary but has been estimated to be as high as 800,000 during the 1960s and 1970s. A more recent study from 2004 estimated the number of exposed workers in the United States to be around 134,000.

The rate of workers becoming sensitized to beryllium varies based on genetics and exposure levels. In one study researchers found the prevalence of beryllium sensitization to range from 9 - 19% depending on the industry. Many workers who are found to be sensitive to beryllium also meet the diagnostic criteria for CBD. In one study of nuclear workers, among those who were sensitized to beryllium, 66% were found to have CBD as well. The rate of progression from beryllium sensitization to CBD has been estimated to be approximately 6-8% per year. Stopping exposure to beryllium in those sensitized has not been definitively shown to stop the progression to CBD.

The overall prevalence of CBD among workers exposed to beryllium has ranged from 1 – 5% depending on industry and time period of study.

The general population is unlikely to develop acute or chronic beryllium disease because ambient air levels of beryllium are normally very low (<0.03 ng/m3).  However, a study found 1% of people living within 3/4 of a mile of a beryllium plant in Lorain, Ohio, had berylliosis after exposure to concentrations estimated to be less than 1 milligram per cubic metre of air. In the United States the Beryllium Case Registry contained 900 records, early cases relating to extraction and fluorescent lamp manufacture, later ones coming from the aerospace, ceramics and metallurgical industries.

History
Since the 1920s, beryllium has been used in electronics, ceramics, research and development labs, aircraft, and the atomic energy and defense industry. Cases of bronchitis and pneumonia-like symptoms were reported in Germany and Russia in the 1930s among workers mining and refining beryllium. By 1946, a cluster of cases associated with fluorescent lamp manufacturers were apparent in the United States, and the lamp industry stopped using beryllium in 1949. At that time, most construction trades and industries were unaware of the potential risks associated with beryllium exposure.

It occasionally killed early workers in nuclear weapons design, such as Herbert L. Anderson.

Beryllium sensitivity testing was first performed as a cutaneous beryllium patch test in the early 1950s, but was discontinued due to the test stimulating sensitization or aggravating existing chronic beryllium disease.

In the 1990s, the DOE began screening employees using the BeLPT test in facilities where beryllium was used, in order to take preventive measures against beryllium exposure; somewhat alarmingly, clerical staff who were never involved in handling the material had developed asymptomatic sensitivities.

The 1954 Isaac Asimov short story "Sucker Bait" is largely concerned with a space colony dying of Beryllium poisoning.

References

External links 

 ATSDR Case Studies in Environmental Medicine: Beryllium Toxicity U.S. Department of Health and Human Services
 CDC – Research on Beryllium Sensitization and Chronic Beryllium Disease – NIOSH Workplace Safety and Health Topic
 Beryllium Network
 Health-cares.net
Instant insight from the Royal Society of Chemistry examining the molecular basis of chronic beryllium disease

Beryllium
Biology and pharmacology of chemical elements
Element toxicology
Lung diseases due to external agents
Occupational diseases